The 2019 László Killik Női Magyar Kupa is the 62nd season of the Hungarian Basketball Cup.

Qualification
Eight highest ranked teams after the first half of the 2018–19 NB I/A regular season qualified to the tournament.

Sopron Basket
Aluinvent DVTK
ZTE Női Kosárlabda Klub
Atomerőmű KSC Szekszárd
PEAC-Pécs
CMB CARGO UNI GYÔR
NKE-Csata
ELTE BEAC Újbuda

Bracket

Semifinals

Bronze match

Final

Final standings

See also
 2018–19 Nemzeti Bajnokság I/A

References

External links
 Official website
 Hungarian Basketball Federaration

Magyar Kupa women